The Aphips chub (Squalius aphipsi) is a cyprinid fish endemic to the Kuban drainages in Russia.

References

Squalius
Fish described in 1927
Taxobox binomials not recognized by IUCN